Haskell is a town in Muskogee County, Oklahoma, United States. The population was 2,007 at the 2010 census, a gain of 13.7 percent over the figure of 1,765 recorded in 2000. Haskell was established in 1904 on the Midland Valley Railroad. It was named for town site developer Charles N. Haskell, who would become the first governor of the State of Oklahoma in 1907.

History
Haskell was founded about one and a half miles northeast of the Muscogee (Creek) Nation town of Sawokla, which already had a post office, a store and a cotton gin. Sawokla was a Hitachita town and had been the home of Creek Chief Samuel Checote. The original  tract had been allotted to Amos Rolland, a member of the Creek Nation. The store and gin relocated from Sawokla to Haskell as soon as the railroad was completed in 1904. The first store, S. Beshara and Brothers, was started in a tent by two immigrants from Syria. Haskell's first post office was established in 1902, with Nat Lambertson, owner of a new hardware and general store, appointed as first postmaster. Other early businesses were C. E. Henson's general store and A. J. Englert's mill and elevator. The Haskell National Bank was organized in 1904, soon followed by the First National Bank, the International Bank, and the Arkansas Valley Bank.  In the early 1990s, the town appointed Charlie B. White, a native son, its first black mayor.  He died on March 17, 2013.

 The railroad enabled farmers near Haskell to ship their produce (grain, hay, corn, melons and cotton) to northern and eastern markets. Haskell counted 720 residents at the time of statehood in 1907. The Robertson Memorial Presbyterian Church, named for a noted missionary family who had lived in the area, was built in 1909. The President of Henry Kendall College came from Muskogee to preside over the dedication. The building is still in use in the 21st Century.

Gas and oil were discovered near Haskell in 1910. This sparked a period of prosperity, and Haskell soon could boast of improvements such as paved streets, concrete sidewalks, electric lights, natural gas lines, and water works.

Completion of the Tulsa-Muskogee Turnpike in 1969 bypassed Haskell and diverted much road traffic from U.S. Highway 64. This caused a significant loss of revenue for many businesses in town.

Geography
Haskell is located at  (35.819951, -95.676956).

Demographics

As of the census of 2000, there were 1,765 people, 679 households, and 482 families residing in the town. There were 763 housing units at an average density of 351.1 per square mile (135.8/km2). The racial makeup of the town was 72.75% White, 8.90% African American, 10.88% Native American, 0.06% Asian, 0.06% from other races, and 7.37% from two or more races. Hispanic or Latino of any race were 0.68% of the population.

There were 679 households, out of which 32.0% had children under the age of 18 living with them, 52.7% were married couples living together, 13.7% had a female householder with no husband present, and 28.9% were non-families. 26.1% of all households were made up of individuals, and 15.0% had someone living alone who was 65 years of age or older. The average household size was 2.54 and the average family size was 3.06.

In the town, the population was spread out, with 27.2% under the age of 18, 7.9% from 18 to 24, 25.2% from 25 to 44, 20.7% from 45 to 64, and 19.0% who were 65 years of age or older. The median age was 38 years. For every 100 females, there were 84.0 males. For every 100 females age 18 and over, there were 81.2 males.

The median income for a household in the town was $25,542, and the median income for a family was $29,196. Males had a median income of $26,413 versus $19,926 for females. The per capita income for the town was $12,805. About 17.8% of families and 21.8% of the population were below the poverty line, including 28.4% of those under age 18 and 19.2% of those age 65 or over.

Transportation
Haskell is served by US Route 64, Oklahoma State Highway 72, and Oklahoma State Highway 104.  US Route 62 and Oklahoma State Highway 16 have a junction just south of town.

The privately owned Haskell Airport (FAA ID: 2K9), about 1 mile northeast of Haskell, features a 3710’ x 30’ paved runway.

Commercial air transportation is available at Tulsa International Airport, about 35 miles north-northwest.

Governance
Haskell is governed by a Town Board of Trustees, which consists of five trustees, each nominated from different wards of the town. Candidates must live in a specific ward. The trustees are then elected at large. The mayor is elected from the board of trustees. The board establishes ordinances (laws) and resolutions (policy) and rates for services.

Recreation
Haskell Lake is located about 3 miles northwest of central Haskell. Created by the WPA, it is about 14 acres in size and known for good fishing.

The Arkansas River, just to the east of town, also offers fishing opportunities for species like catfish, though access there is typically had through private lands.

The town has Haskell City Park, where it has held its Frontier Day celebration.

Notable people
 Charlie B. White (1917–2013), born in Paris,  TX he was raised in Haskell then moved to Seattle, WA but came back home after retiring from the Boeing company after 32 years of service and became Haskell's first black mayor.
 William M. Guy (1930–2009) Owner/Editor/Publisher The Haskell News Award Winning Weekly Newspaper 1962–2012. Mr. Guy was instrumental in bringing a number of businesses to Haskell. He was on the board of the McClellan–Kerr Arkansas River Navigation System on the Arkansas River.

References

External links
  Encyclopedia of Oklahoma History and Culture - Haskell

Towns in Muskogee County, Oklahoma
Towns in Oklahoma
Populated places established in 1904